Highway 728 is a highway in the Canadian province of Saskatchewan. It runs from the Alberta border near Surprise, where it continues as Alberta Highway 528, to Highway 32 near Cantuar.

Highway 728 passes through the communities of Golden Prairie, Nadeauville, and Hazlet.

See also 
Roads in Saskatchewan
Transportation in Saskatchewan

References 

728